Alessandro Araldi (c. 1460 – c. 1529) was an Italian painter of the Renaissance, active mainly in Parma.

Little is known of his biography. He apparently assisted with contemporary Cristoforo Caselli (il Temperello). His work shows the influences of the school of Melozzo da Forlì and of early Venetian Renaissance painters such as Giovanni Bellini and the Vivarini, but also Lorenzo Costa from Ferrara. He painted frescoes in the Benedictine monastery of San Paolo. He also painted two scenes with the story of St. Catherine, the Dispute before the emperor Maximilian and St. Catherine and St. Jerome, including an odd Annunciation (1514), for the abbess  Giovanna da Piacenza (1514). Antonio Allegri (Correggio) would complete his own masterpiece frescoes for the abbess in a strikingly different, and for the age, more modern style.

Gallery

Sources

External links

1460s births
1520s deaths
15th-century Italian painters
Italian male painters
16th-century Italian painters
Painters from Parma
Renaissance painters
Fresco painters